In quantum mechanics, the particle in a one-dimensional lattice is a problem that occurs in the model of a periodic crystal lattice. The potential is caused by ions in the periodic structure of the crystal creating an electromagnetic field so electrons are subject to a regular potential inside the lattice.  It is a generalization of the free electron model, which assumes zero potential inside the lattice.

Problem definition
When talking about solid materials, the discussion is mainly around crystals – periodic lattices. Here we will discuss a 1D lattice of positive ions.

The mathematical representation of the potential is a periodic function with a period . According to Bloch's theorem, the wavefunction solution of the Schrödinger equation when the potential is periodic, can be written as:

where  is a periodic function which satisfies . It is the Bloch factor with Floquet exponent  which gives rise to the band structure of the energy spectrum of the Schrödinger equation with a periodic potential like the Kronig–Penney potential or a cosine function as in the Mathieu equation.

When nearing the edges of the lattice, there are problems with the boundary condition. Therefore, we can represent the ion lattice as a ring following the Born–von Karman boundary conditions. If  is the length of the lattice so that , then the number of ions in the lattice is so big, that when considering one ion, its surrounding is almost linear, and the wavefunction of the electron is unchanged. So now, instead of two boundary conditions we get one circular boundary condition:

If  is the number of ions in the lattice, then we have the relation: . Replacing in the boundary condition and applying Bloch's theorem will result in a quantization for :

Kronig–Penney model
The Kronig–Penney model (named after Ralph Kronig and William Penney) is a simple, idealized quantum-mechanical system that consists of an infinite periodic array of rectangular potential barriers.

The potential function is approximated by a rectangular potential:

Using Bloch's theorem, we only need to find a solution for a single period, make sure it is continuous and smooth, and to make sure the function  is also continuous and smooth.

Considering a single period of the potential:
We have two regions here. We will solve for each independently:
Let E be an energy value above the well (E>0)
 For : 
For : 

To find u(x) in each region, we need to manipulate the electron's wavefunction:

And in the same manner:

To complete the solution we need to make sure the probability function is continuous and smooth, i.e.:

These conditions yield the following matrix:

For us to have a non-trivial solution, the determinant of the matrix must be 0. This leads us to the following expression:

To further simplify the expression, we perform the following approximations:

The expression will now be:

For energy values inside the well (E < 0), we get:

Following the same approximations as above, we arrive at

with the same formula for P as in the previous case .

Band gaps in the Kronig–Penney model

In the previous paragraph, the only variables not determined by the parameters of the physical system are the energy E and the crystal momentum k. Thus, the expression gives rise to the dispersion relation.

The right hand side of the last expression above can sometimes be greater than 1 or less than –1, in which case there is no value of k that can make the equation true.  Since , that means there are certain values of E for which there are no eigenfunctions of the Schrödinger equation.  These values constitute the band gap.

Thus, the Kronig–Penney model is one of the simplest periodic potentials to exhibit a band gap.

Kronig–Penney model: alternative solution
An alternative treatment  to a similar problem is given. Here we have a delta periodic potential:

Since this potential is periodic, we could expand it as a Fourier series:

where

The wave-function, using Bloch's theorem, is equal to  where  is a function that is periodic in the lattice, which means that we can expand it as a Fourier series as well:

Thus the wave function is:

Putting this into the Schrödinger equation, we get:

or rather:

Now we recognize that:

Plug this into the Schrödinger equation:

Solving this for  we get:

Or:

Conveniently,  cancels out and we get:

Or:

To save ourselves some unnecessary notational effort we define a new variable:

and finally our expression is:

We can juggle this expression a little bit to make it more suggestive (use Partial fraction decomposition):

If we use a nice identity of a sum of the cotangent function (Equation 18) which says:

and plug it into our expression we get to:

These are the so-called band-gaps, which can be shown to exist in any shape of periodic potential (not just delta or square barriers).

For a different and detailed calculation of the gap formula (i.e. for the gap between bands) and the level splitting of eigenvalues of the one-dimensional Schrödinger equation see Müller-Kirsten. Corresponding results for the cosine potential (Mathieu equation) are also given in detail in this reference.

Particle in a one-dimensional lattice of finite length

Recently, it is found that the problem on particle in an ideal one-dimensional lattice of finite
is another one of the few problems in quantum mechanics which can be solved analytically,
based on the mathematical theory of periodic differential equations.  
In the following we briefly describe some major conclusions of the new theory. Readers who are interested in the mathematical reasonings and further details are referred to the original publications.

We are mainly interested in cases where there is always a band gap between two consecutive energy bands. 
For such cases, the new theory found that there are two different types of states in a one-dimensional lattice of finite length:
Corresponding to
each energy band of the Bloch wave, there are  states in the finite crystal whose energies are
There is always one and only one state in the finite crystal corresponding to each band gap of the Bloch wave, whose energy is dependent on 
This state is either a constant-energy confined band-edge state or a surface state in the band gap.
The very existence of such a -dependent state is a fundamental distinction of the quantum confinement of Bloch waves.

See also
 Free electron model
 Empty lattice approximation
 Nearly free electron model
 Crystal structure
 Mathieu function

References

External links
 "The Kronig–Penney Model" by Michael Croucher, an interactive calculation of 1d periodic potential band structure using Mathematica, from  The Wolfram Demonstrations Project.

Condensed matter physics
Electronics concepts
Quantum models